Paths, Prints is an album by Norwegian jazz composer and saxophonist Jan Garbarek recorded in December 1981 and released on the ECM label in 1982.

Reception
The Allmusic review by Ron Wynn awarded the album 3 stars calling it "One of the better, more exciting releases".

Track listing
All compositions by Jan Garbarek
 "The Path" - 7:11   
 "Footprints" - 10:06   
 "Kite Dance" - 5:35   
 "To B.E." - 3:10   
 "The Move" - 6:39   
 "Arc" - 5:01   
 "Considering the Snail" - 6:30   
 "Still" - 6:18

Personnel 
 Jan Garbarek - soprano saxophone, tenor saxophone, wood flute, percussion
 Bill Frisell - guitar
 Eberhard Weber - bass
 Jon Christensen - drums, percussion

References 

ECM Records albums
Jan Garbarek albums
1981 albums
Albums produced by Manfred Eicher